A Midsummer's Nightmare is a 2017 psychological thriller film directed by Gary Fleder. It is a modern adaptation of the play A Midsummer Night's Dream by William Shakespeare.

Synopsis 
Four young lovers go into the woods pursue their romantic desires but find their fantasies and secrets being used against them.

Cast 
 Paul Walter Hauser as Nick Bottoms
 Eric Balfour as Mark
 Dominic Monaghan as Mike Puck
 Thomas Cadrot as Agent Wills
 Casey Deidrick as Liam
 Courtney Love as Titania
 Daisy Head as Elena
 Anjali Jay as Agent Radlas
 Chelsea Gilligan as Josselin
 Chad Rook as Blane Thomas
 Ellie Gall as Hannah Becker
 Rhys Ward as Royce
 Jake Robinson as Daniel Brooks
 Kylee Bush as Actress
 Jason William Day as Big Brother
 Lucius Fairburn as Little Brother

Production 
The film was produced as a pilot for a planned hour-long anthology series but the pilot was not picked up as a series. Filming took place in Vancouver and elsewhere in British Columbia, Canada from October 31 to November 18, 2016. Liz Gateley, Executive Vice President and Head of Programming for Lifetime, stated that the intent was to develop "content that redefines what it means to be a Lifetime show." The production received some media attention for booking Courtney Love in a role.

Broadcast
The pilot was originally scheduled to premiere on July 28, 2017 but was then moved to July 14 and then again to July 31, when it ultimately aired.

Reception 
Reviewer Duane of the website Shakespeare Geek gave the film a negative review, doubting the existence of "any Shakespeare of note" in it.

References

External links 
 

2017 psychological thriller films
2017 television films
2017 films
American psychological thriller films
Films based on A Midsummer Night's Dream
Films directed by Gary Fleder
Films scored by James Dooley
Films shot in Vancouver
Lifetime (TV network) films
Modern adaptations of works by William Shakespeare
Television pilots not picked up as a series
American thriller television films
2010s English-language films
2010s American films